The Belgrade Centre railway station, colloquially known as Prokop, is the new central railway station in Belgrade, Serbia. The station is located in the Belgrade municipality of Savski Venac. Although unfinished, it serves as de facto main railway station of the city, after replacing the old main station at the Belgrade Waterfront.

The unsuccessful, decades-long attempted construction of the new central railway station of Belgrade was hampered by a lack of funding to finish adjoining 14 km of tunnels, several railway bridges including the New Railroad Bridge across the Sava river, a new road network connecting to the city and technical installations. Construction of the new station faced the countless setbacks in the period of several decades. The entire construction process has been described as infamous, where deadlines were continuously falling one after another.

Belgrade Centre station was opened on 26 January 2016, serving two daily trains to Novi Sad, as well as Belgrade commuter railways. Following gradual re-routing, it gained its current role on 1 July 2018. 
It is connected to the city centre by bus route 36 (GSP Belgrade) to Savski Trg and Slavija, operating every 40 minutes.

Construction

History

Beginning 

The ill-fated construction of the new railway station, which was supposed to replace the Belgrade Main railway station in Savamala, was to last for decades. Originally, in the late 1960s, it was supposed to be constructed near the present interchange of Autokomanda, but the idea was suddenly dropped, and one of the major architectural authorities at the time, Branko Žeželj, picked Prokop instead, which ultimately left the Autokomanda interchange unfinished — the exit in the Niš direction was only finished in 2007. The idea was presented publicly in February 1970. It also included the removal of all tracks from the Savamala (Sava Amphitheatre) and of the Belgrade Main railway station, too, while the location along the river was to be turned into the vast green areas. City assembly adopted the decision on constructing the new station in March 1971. The Council for Urbanism drafted the projected construction of the new railway station later that year. The project was monumental and expensive, without a precedent in Yugoslavia. It was envisioned to be "large enough for the entire 21st century" with 10,000 commuters per hour. Because of that, including the seemingly unrealistic deadline of only 18 months, the Council's session after which the plan was given the green light, was very turbulent and lasted for 7.5 hours. In 1974 the design project was finished, preparatory works officially started on 3 December 1976, and full construction began on 8 October 1977. The station building was planned to have a bird-shaped roof. The station was planned with 8 platforms and 11 tracks.

Deadline for completion was 1 May 1979, but the rapidly deteriorating economic situation in Yugoslavia at the time slowed construction and the project was halted in 1980. In May 1984, the notion of abandoning the project altogether, due to high costs, was officially considered for the first time. Construction resumed in 1990 and in the next several years was stopped and restarted several times. The project itself was simplified. In 1996 a new contract was signed with the Energoprojekt company. The President of Serbia Slobodan Milošević and Prime Minister Mirko Marjanović officially opened the construction of the concrete roof slab on 7 July 1996, which was for the most part finished in 1999, but the building was halted again due to the NATO bombing of Serbia and lack of funds.

Restart 

In 2005, an international competition was held to find the strategic partner who would finish the station and acquire rights to build and sell commercial facilities. The Hungarian company TriGranit was chosen, but in 2008, TriGranit was dismissed and the contract with Energoprojekt from 1996 was reactivated. Energoprojekt came second on the public bidding but still was chosen. As the works were to last for 14 months, 2010 was set as the final deadline, but there was no progress due to the lack of funds. Also, this project excluded the construction of the commercial area. In 2012, a €25.8 million loan was granted by the Kuwait Fund for Arab Economic Development, and on 3 December 2014 work was resumed, with the Energoprojekt as the lead company of the construction consortium, being chosen again after the bidding. The work was expected to be completed in 14 months, and the station was indeed officially opened on 26 January 2016 by the prime minister Aleksandar Vučić. However, the new station was not used to capacity and was basically still just one of a dozen secondary stations in Belgrade.

On 10 December 2017, all but three lines of the domestic transport were transferred from the Main station to Prokop. International trains continued using the Main station, and that due to the fact that, by this time, Belgrade Centre is still not completed. In December 2017, the station had no station building or any commercial facilities, two tracks were still not finished as well as the roof above them, the road connections to the rest of the city are only half completed, etc. Ministry of construction estimated that, if the funds were granted, the entire work could be finished in two years.

Central Station 

In January 2018 it was announced that the old station will be completely closed for traffic on 1 July 2018, even though none of the projects needed for a complete removal of the railway traffic are finished. While Prokop is incomplete, a projected main goods station in Zemun is not being adapted while there are also no projects on the Belgrade railway beltway. A series of temporary solutions have to be applied, including a defunct and deteriorated Topčider railway station, which is revitalized and adapted for auto trains. The major flaw remains a bad public transportation connection, so the railway company asked officially for this problem to be solved. It was also announced in January 2018 that the official deadline for the construction of the station building in Prokop is two years, however there were no funds for it at the time. A second part of the Kuwaiti loan (€50 million) was not approved and the needed public procurements won't be finished till the end of 2018. The central freight station in Zemun also has a deadline of two years, but the works are scheduled to start at the end of 2018. This means that the planned Belgrade railway junction won't be finished before 2021, at best. However, minister for transportation Zorana Mihajlović gave conflicting deadlines in December 2017. She said that the station building in Prokop will be built from April 2018 to April 2019 and that freight station Zemun should be finished by the end of 2018.

Only the access road from the direction of the Bulevar Kralja Aleksandra Karađorđevića was finished in 2018. The trains from Bar, Montenegro started to end their journey at Centar instead of Topčider by December 2021.

Additional  of roof was finished in December 2018 after 8 months of works, so now some  out of planned  was completed. The authorities again refused to disclose the date of full completion of the entire station complex. It was evident at this point that works on station building will not start in 2018, missing tracks for two additional platforms haven't been laid nor anything has been done on Zemun freight station.

Though itself inadequately equipped, the Novi Beograd railway station initially de facto took over the role of the main station after the closing of the old one, as it is better connected with other parts of the city and way more accessible than the Prokop. By early 2019 it came out as one of the busiest stations. As for the Prokop itself, when the traffic was rerouted in July 2018, it was announced that the station will operate 195 lines: 16 international, 56 local and 123 communal BG Voz lines. By February 2019 only 60 lines remained operational: 1 international, 24 regional and 35 local.

As it became apparent that the Kuwaiti loan will not be available, in July 2019 the government announced a public bidding for the partner who will build the station's main building, commercial facilities and parking lots. Even though the present project for the station was accepted by the government in 2015, the future partner will be allowed to present its own design. Though the government claimed since 2016 that numerous domestic and foreign companies were interested, by October 2019 only one applied - Railway City Belgrade, Dutch-Bulgarian company recently registered in Serbia. In April 2020 it was announced that the talks with the Railway City Belgrade are in the "final phase", but without any specifications on the price or timeline. It was stated, however, that the concrete roof slab will be finished first, then the urban project will be drafted, followed by the new re-parceling. That means the entire 2015 urban plan was scrapped, while the works on the station's building can't start before the second half of 2021 and will be finished in 2023 in the best-case scenario.

In May 2020 construction of the remaining roof slab continued, with deadline set for the summer of 2021. After the roof is finished, the remaining two tracks beneath it, numbers 1 and 2, will be finished. In the meantime, the framework agreement with the Railway City Belgrade company was announced. It is not binding, and the company will first survey the bearing capacity of the roof slab, in order to see how much can be built on it, judging how much commercial space beside the station's building can be built before they accept the job.

Mihajlović's successor, new minister for transportation Tomislav Momirović visited the site in December 2020 and stated that there is still much work to be done, but reconfirmed dates of August 2021 for the completion of the roof slab, and end of 2023 for the completion of everything. Design of the new station building, work of "PFB Dizajn", was made public in January 2021. Start was planned for the fall of 2021, deadline for the building was the end of 2022, and for the entire complex (commercial venues, parking lots, etc.), the end of 2024. The contractor also stated that all depends on the state of the roof slab, which is not fully finished. The finished section was surveyed, showing the reconstruction is needed as it is not strong enough for the planned construction on top of it.

Works on the roof slab were halted again when a previously unknown tunnel was discovered under the Prokupačka Street. Electric cables of unknown purpose were also discovered in the tunnel. This discovery prompted rewrites of the project, and moving a deadline to spring of 2022. Finishing of the slab was then moved to August 2022, construction of the station's building was planned to start in October 2022, and it was estimated that further €70 million are needed for the full completion.

In the late March 2022, a major milestone for the Serbian Railways was the launch of the first Serbian high speed rail connection, which runs between Belgrade Centre and Novi Sad railway station.

Finally, after completion of the roof slab over platforms 1 and 2, the construction of the station building and commercial centre officially began on the 8 August 2022, as the public-private partnership of the Serbian Railways Infrastructure and private company "Railway City" from Belgrade. The deadline for the completion of the construction works is now set for November 2023, followed by the furnishing of the building. Construction of two missing platforms was moved. The entire station complex will be named  "Gate of Serbia". Apart from the station building itself, it will include twelve commercial buildings (four should be finished by the summer of 2024), a series of parking lots, and a garage. The entire complex will be finished in 2026.

Old works didn't fit into the new project, which now divided the complex in two: the station itself (at point 85), and the commercial, Railway City Belgrade operated section (after point 105). Previous concrete construction on the slab itself was demolished, purportedly with great care not to cause damage to the platforms below, especially in regard to the leaks. However, starting in November 2022, the platforms were flooded at every heavy rain.

Criticism 

The construction of the Belgrade Waterfront and track removal in Savamala and apparent pressure to finish the work before the expiration of the deadline, contributed to the hastily done job. Basically, no other facilities were built except for the tracks. The roof was unfinished and due to rain and wind the platforms on the periphery are covered in water. Access roads were not completed either and Prokop is generally badly connected with other parts of Belgrade. Regarding how distant the station is from downtown, its official name, Belgrade Center, is often mocked and ignored by the citizens and passengers who almost without exception call it Prokop.

Member of the Serbian Academy of Sciences and Arts and a public transportation expert, Vukan Vučić, labeled Prokop as the "most disastrous error of the Belgrade transportation". He asserted that Prokop, in functional terms, is not a station at all and that, though it has been named Belgrade Centre, is actually further from the city's centre than the old station was. He added that the location is a neglected, desperately bad choice and topographically inaccessible from all sides. Another member of the Academy, transportation engineer Dušan Teodorović, also criticized the project. As nothing of the planned infrastructure has been built – urbanization and development of the neighborhood, numerous commercial objects, hotels, excellent commuting connections, two metro lines, taxi station – Vučić maintains that the isolation of the location will directly bring to the further decrease in the number of railway passengers.

Those who participated in the planning of the station maintain that Prokop was the best solution and that the problem is that other parts of the plan weren't carried out or have been dropped completely. They say that the idea was to have only through stations in the city and not a terminus station. Some of the missing infrastructure which they named, and which were considered megalomaniacal to begin with by the critics, include three additional railway stations (new or expanded: New Belgrade, Zemun, South), two additional bus stations (South, East) and lengthening and widening of the Deligradska Street from its current end at the highway, including the demolition of the urbanized hill of Maleško Brdo, east of Prokop.

Despite numerous major drawbacks of the station, minister Mihajlović in July 2018 stated that the priority in Prokop was "elevators and escalators", but none of the elevators were installed by December 2018. Construction of two elevators began in February 2019 and they became operational in June 2019.

Controversies 

In the late 1990s, instigated by first lady Mirjana Marković, an initiative was started to build a Chinese commercial centre in Prokop, which was to enhance the economic cooperation and trade between China and Serbia.

Supervisor Dragan Dobrašinović, who reported to the Financial Board of the National Assembly of Serbia, said that procedures for the 2014 reconstruction were "distinctively political" due to the pushing of the Belgrade Waterfront project. He also pointed out that the projected price was inflated by over 5.5 million euros, as the estimate was 20.25 million and the loan was 25.8 million euros. The Assembly's Board accepted Dobrašinović's report, but dismissed him and no legal proceedings followed.

When it was announced that the Kuwaitis would grant the loan, Serbian authorities published a computer model of what the future station building would look like. It turned out to be a picture of the Hong Kong's West Kowloon Terminus, set against Belgrade as a background. The 2009 project is the work of the Aedas company and architect Andrew Bromberg who personally reacted to the plagiarism.

In January 2021, Transparency Serbia and other organizations reported that the procedure, by which company "Railway City Belgrade" was selected as the contractor for the station's building, was against the law. State Property Office refuted the claim, saying that, in this specific case, different laws are applied. The prosecutor's office declined to act upon the Transparency's complaint. When petitioned by the Transparency to disclose on which documents they rejected to act, the prosecution responded there is no "legitimate interest for public to know" and that it is only "personal petitioner's interest" to know the information.

City decided to build additional residential buildings in March 2021, as part of the wider railway station complex. The selected lot used to be a green area, until the temporary worker's quarters were placed in the 1990s when the construction of the station was resumed. They were abandoned after 2005, and the local residents wanted to bring back the greenery, plant trees and build a children's playground. Tenants' associations of the buildings in the vicinity of the planned construction coordinated against the project, and city responded that "nothing is definite yet". In October 2021, city announced plans to build  of commercial and residential space on this location. The investor is also the "Railway City Belgrade" company. Local residents continually organized protests, opposing the construction of tall buildings. In December 2021, city announced withdrawal of the project due to the "accepted citizens' complaints", and as the construction could "indeed trigger the mass wasting again", though the reporters connected the decision with the upcoming Belgrade elections in April 2022. Existing structure on the lot will be adapted into the communal center in 2022.

In November 2022 city announced they awarded another lot, in Block No, 40 in New Belgrade, to "Railway City Belgrade" as a compensation for the scrapped plans forg additional skyscrapers in Prokop. The company was conditioned to finish the station in Prokop first, before it can build anything in New Belgrade.

Assessment 

Due to the countless setbacks in the period of several decades, construction of the new station has been called , after the folk epic poem The Building of Skadar, where the town of Skadar was unsuccessfully built for a long time. With all its inadequacies (bad interconnection, lack of the stationary building, planned omission from the first subway line), and for decades still unfulfilled task of representing a "construction pride of modern Belgrade Railway junction", by June 2021 it was noted that the term "Central" in the station's name is simply irritating to the passengers.

Continuously hindered with numerous problems and bad positioning, by 2022 it became apparent that Prokop will never take the role of the former Main railway station, as the New Belgrade railway station already took over as the busiest station in the entire state, with future plans of expanding it into the central traffic hub in Belgrade. The New Belgrade railway station, though itself inadequately equipped, initially took over the role of the main station, as it was better connected with other parts of the city and way more accessible than the Prokop, and by early 2019 came out as one of the busiest stations.

In March 2022, the Transportation minister Tomislav Momirović confirmed that the New Belgrade railway station "will remain" the busiest one, not only in Belgrade but in the entire Serbia. At the time, the majority of passengers on the inaugural trip via the high-speed rail used the New Belgrade station, not the Prokop. Being held back in almost every department, by this time it became apparent that, though it may become an important station in the future, the Prokop will never take the role of the former Main railway station. Construction of the new Belgrade's main bus station next to the New Belgrade railway station shows that the decision was to make the New Belgrade station part of the future central transportation hub in Belgrade.

Image gallery

See also 
 Belgrade Main railway station
 Belgrade railway junction

References

External links 

 Clip of the planned railway hub with metro interchange
 Clip about the Belgrade railway hub and Beovoz commuter network 

Railway stations in Belgrade
Railway stations opened in 1974
1974 establishments in Serbia